Rampura is a village and former petty Koli-ruled princely state in Gujarat, western India.

As a state, Rampura was a part of the Western India States Agency. It was classified as a thana (i.e. a very small state) in Katosan, which were entities smaller than even a non-salute state and something of an administrative anomaly, although seen as an expedience in the years immediately following the 1857 Rebellion, the state was attached to Baroda State in June 1940. Such states, says historian John McLeod, "lacked the resources to maintain anything beyond the most rudimentary governments, indeed that they were so tiny that their independent existence was simply ludicrous." It had previously been a part of the Rewa Kantha Agency.

References

External links 
 Imperial Gazetteer on dsal.uchicago.edu - Mahi Kantha

Princely states of Gujarat
Koli princely states